Brody Roybal (born May 25, 1998) is an American ice sled hockey player.

Early life and career
Roybal was born in Melrose Park, Illinois. He is a congenital amputee, missing both legs through the hip joint, meaning he has no leg stumps. He won a gold medal with the American team at the 2014, 2018 and 2022 Winter Paralympics.

References

External links 
 
 

1998 births
Living people
American sledge hockey players
Paralympic sledge hockey players of the United States
Ice sledge hockey players at the 2014 Winter Paralympics
Para ice hockey players at the 2018 Winter Paralympics
Para ice hockey players at the 2022 Winter Paralympics
Medalists at the 2014 Winter Paralympics
Medalists at the 2018 Winter Paralympics
Medalists at the 2022 Winter Paralympics
Paralympic bronze medalists for the United States
Paralympic gold medalists for the United States
Paralympic medalists in sledge hockey